Early Joni – 1963 is a compilation album by singer-songwriter Joni Mitchell, released on October 30, 2020, by Rhino Records. The album, which is the second overall and the first auxiliary release of the Joni Mitchell Archives, features one of Mitchell's first live performances, a broadcast set on Saskatoon radio station CFQC AM. The cover art for the release features a self portrait drawn by Mitchell that is based on an early photo in her personal archive, and marks the first visual artwork that she had completed in several years. This separate title was pressed exclusively on vinyl, though it serves as a companion to Joni Mitchell Archives – Vol. 1: The Early Years (1963–1967), the box set from which its material is derived.

Background and recording
In 1963, now-retired radio DJ Barry Bowman of CFQC 600 lived with three of his friends in downtown Saskatoon, Canada. During that summer, Bowman and his friends met and befriended Joni Mitchell, who at the time was still going by her birth name of Joni Anderson. The group would frequently congregate with Mitchell at the large house they were renting, the local swimming pool, or the South Saskatchewan River, where they "drank beer and ate hot dogs." One of Bowman's friends and co-tenants, Danny Evanishen, referred to that period of time as being "the summer that Joni came to [them]." Evanishen is also attributed as being the person who encouraged Mitchell to take up playing the guitar, loaning her his guitar to play in lieu of her ukulele. Encouraged by Mitchell's budding talent, Bowman invited her to the radio station to record nine traditional folk songs over the course of two nights. He gave her a copy of the audition tape and kept the masters, which were later unearthed by his ex-wife in 2015.

Track listing

Personnel
Credits adapted from Discogs.

Performers
 Joni Mitchell – vocals; guitar

Production and recording
 Allison Boron – project assistance
 Barry Bowman – recording
 Marcy Gensic – project assistance
 Bernie Grundman – mastering; lacquer cutting
 Joni Mitchell – reissue producer
 Patrick Milligan – reissue producer
 Jane Tani – project assistance

Design
 Barry Bowman – liner notes
 Sheryl Farber – booklet editor
 Lisa Glines – art direction; design
 Joni Mitchell – cover illustration
 Doran Tyson – product manager
 Shannon Ward – packaging manager

Charts

References

Joni Mitchell albums
2020 albums